Ulpio Minucci (June 29, 1917 – March 9, 2007) was an Italian-born American composer and musician.

Minucci wrote a number of popular hits in the 1950s, including "Domani,"  "A Thousand Thoughts of You," and "Felicia." He was nominated for two Emmy Awards for his work on ABC's Saga of Western Man in 1964 and 1965. He is also well known among anime fans as the composer of the theme and musical score for the 1985 animated television series Robotech.

He also played piano on Round Trip, a 1974 jazz album by Japanese saxophonist Sadao Watanabe.

In Jan 10, 1989, he attempted to sue Frank Agrama and Harmony Gold, Inc. for alleged copyright infringement and various other claims. The case was dismissed March 1, 1989, without motion to appeal.

Minucci married his wife Catherine in 1952 with whom he had a son, Chieli, and a daughter, Nina. Chieli Minucci became an Emmy-winning jazz guitarist, who recorded covers of some of his father's songs.  Ulpio Minucci died of natural causes at his home in Brentwood, Los Angeles, California on March 9, 2007. He was survived by his wife, children, and three grandchildren

Works
 Robotech: The Shadow Chronicles (2006) – original theme
 Robotech: Battlecry (2002) – original theme
 Robotech II: The Sentinels (1988) – original theme
 Robotech: The Movie (1986) – original theme
 Robotech (1985) – composer
 The White Lions (1981) – music supervisor
 The Day That Shook the World (1975) – musical director
 Saga of Western Man (1964) – composer

References

External links
 
 

1917 births
2007 deaths
20th-century American composers
20th-century Italian musicians
American male composers
Italian composers
Italian emigrants to the United States
Italian male composers
People from Brentwood, Los Angeles
Robotech cast and crew
20th-century American male musicians